Orsolya "Orsi" Kocsis is a Hungarian fashion, glamour, and former art nude model who was 2005's Hungarian Playmate of the Year (which she won by audience election as a special prize).

Biography

Early life
Orsolya Kocsis was born on September 6, 1984 in Debrecen, Hungary.

Education
Kocsis moved to Budapest at 19. She speaks Hungarian, German and English.

Career

Modeling

Kocsis' modeling career began shortly after being discovered sitting in a hair salon by a photographer.

Television
Kocsis states in her audition video with 1By-day that she is only interested in softcore pornography related work.

Personal life
She is a kickboxing and aerobics enthusiast and loves sports; seeing them as a prerequisite for a well maintained body. She currently lists her marital status as single. According to her Playboy interview in 2005, she does not plan to marry until she is over 30 and then would like to have one or two children. In a 2009 magazine interview, Orsi states that her nude modeling is not hard-core pornographic. Orsi also states, she has decided to forgo nude modeling in the future with the possible exception of work with CKM magazine.

References

External links

Orsi Kocsis at Body in Mind

1984 births
Living people
People from Debrecen
Hungarian female models